This I Swear may refer to:
 "This I Swear" (Nick Lachey song), 2003
 "This I Swear" (Kim Wilde song), 1996
 "This I Swear" by The Skyliners, Calico Records, 1960